Sherwood is a constituency represented in the House of Commons of the UK Parliament since 2010 by Mark Spencer, a Conservative. The constituency takes its name from the Sherwood Forest which is in the area.

Boundaries

1983–1997: The District of Newark wards of Bilsthorpe, Blidworth, Boughton, Clipstone, Dover Beck, Edwinstowe, Farnsfield, Fishpool, Lowdham, Ollerton North, Ollerton South, Rainworth, and Rufford, the District of Ashfield wards of Hucknall Central, Hucknall East, Hucknall North, and Hucknall West, and the Borough of Gedling wards of Bestwood St Albans (Bestwood Village only), Calverton, Lambley, Newstead, and Woodborough.

1997–2010: The District of Newark and Sherwood wards of Bilsthorpe, Blidworth, Boughton, Clipstone, Dover Beck, Edwinstowe, Farnsfield, Lowdham, Ollerton North, Ollerton South, Rainworth, and Rufford, the District of Ashfield wards of Hucknall Central, Hucknall East, Hucknall North, and Hucknall West, and the Borough of Gedling wards of Bestwood Park, Calverton, Lambley, Newstead, Ravenshead, and Woodborough.

2010–present: The District of Newark and Sherwood wards of Bilsthorpe, Blidworth, Boughton, Clipstone, Edwinstowe, Farnsfield, Ollerton, and Rainworth, the District of Ashfield wards of Hucknall Central, Hucknall East, Hucknall North, and Hucknall West, and the Borough of Gedling wards of Bestwood Village, Calverton, Lambley, Newstead, Ravenshead, and Woodborough.

The constituency is in central Nottinghamshire, covering parts of three local government authorities: the Ashfield district, parts of the Gedling borough, and the western part of the Newark and Sherwood district, the largest geographical area of the seat.

Constituency profile
The seat name refers to the Sherwood Forest, world famous for its association with the legend of Robin Hood. The seat is an area of contrasts such as Ravenshead, home to some of Nottinghamshire's most affluent residents, numerous smaller rural villages, one mining village and many ex-mining villages, and the town of Hucknall, the largest in the constituency, now a commuter town, but one which remains involved with mining. Thoresby, Edwinstowe once contained a large operational coal mine underground. It does not contain the Nottingham City ward of Sherwood, which is further south, within the Nottingham East constituency.  
In statistics
The constituency consists of Census Output Areas of three local government districts with similar characteristics: a working population whose income is close to the national average, and lower than average reliance upon social housing. At the end of 2012, the unemployment rate in the constituency stood as 3.5% of the population claiming jobseekers allowance, compared to an identical regional average which was below the national average. Taking the part of Newark and Sherwood that contributes to the seat: a slightly below average 18.6% of its population are without a car, a medium 25.1% of the population are without qualifications and a high 24.2% have level 4 qualifications or above (2011). In terms of tenure, 70.2% of homes are owned outright or on a mortgage by occupants as at the 2011 census across that district.

History 
On the constituency's creation in 1983, Andy Stewart gained the seat for the Conservatives in their landslide victory that year with a small majority of 658. The Nottinghamshire miners drifted further from Labour during the 1984 strike and Stewart was re-elected with an increased majority in 1987. However, in 1992 the seat was gained for Labour by Paddy Tipping, who held it until he retired in 2010, when the seat was regained for the Conservatives by Mark Spencer, by a majority of 214.  In 2015, Spencer's lead over the second placed candidate increased to 4,647 votes. This further increased in 2017 and another big swing to the Conservatives in 2019 saw Spencer's majority increase to 16,186, the first time a Conservative had a five-figure majority in the seat.

Members of Parliament

Elections

Elections in the 2010s

Elections in the 2000s

Elections in the 1990s

Elections in the 1980s

See also
List of parliamentary constituencies in Nottinghamshire

Notes

References

Parliamentary constituencies in Nottinghamshire
Constituencies of the Parliament of the United Kingdom established in 1983
Sherwood Forest